Tymo Lin, novelist, columnist and book critic, Lin is an author member of the Crime Writers' Association (UK), P. A. member of the Crime Writers of Canada, and director of the Mystery Writers of Taiwan.  He was a finalist in The 4th Soji Shimada Mystery Awards for 2015, a mystery critic for books.com.tw, columnist for ETtoday (Taiwan), Distinctive Taste magazine (San Francisco), World Journal Weekly (New York) and The Mess-Age (Taiwan).

Lin was born in Taipei, currently living in Canada, and graduated from The Vancouver Film School - 3D Animation & Visual Effects.  He was a columnist for nine years in North America and has frequently been giving lectures about mystery writing to readers in Taiwan and the USA.

Biography 
His award winning mystery novel, The Thermosphere Murders, is about two American astronauts' murder cases and the abnormal explosion of a Russian spacecraft returning from the imaginary space station, "The Universal Space Station".  This unique new type of mystery was selected to be one of the top 3 finalists in "The 4th Soji Shimada Mystery Awards" and is currently in circulation at the San Francisco Public Library.

Lin became a full time novelist after receiving the mystery award, his 2016 novel, The Palace of Firebirds, is published by Showwe.  It is a mystery and a love story spanning half a century.  From the modern computer age back to those years when thousands of US Armed Forces from the Vietnam War were taking R&R in Taiwan.

He also co-translated one of the Mystery Writers of America's books, Writing Mysteries, into the Chinese language published by Marco Polo Press in 2018.  One of Lin's novels, Wake Me Up at Happyland, has been nominated by the Ministry of Culture (Taiwan) to be included in the Taiwan pavilion at the 2018 Frankfurt Book Fair in Germany.

Awards and honours 
The 4th Soji Shimada Mystery Awards (finalist)

The 10th Mystery Writers of Taiwan Awards (first stage nomination)

Publications 
Mystery Novels
 The Thermosphere Murders (Traditional Chinese 熱層之密室 2015) 
 The Thermosphere Murders (Simplified Chinese 热层之密室 2016) 
 The Palace of Firebirds (Traditional Chinese 火鳥宮行動 2016) 
 Aquatic Eye (Traditional Chinese 水眼：微笑藥師探案系列 2017) 
 Wake Me Up at Happyland (Traditional Chinese 幸福到站，叫醒我 2017) 
The Third Part of The Stars of Heaven (Traditional Chinese 星辰的三分之一 2018) 

Translation
Writing Mysteries  (Traditional Chinese 推理寫作祕笈 2018) 

Travel Book

Tracing The Sun, Spanning Over The 30°N Latitude (Traditional Chinese 追著太陽跑 ，一頭栽進去用力戰勝自己！ 2016) 

Short Stories
 Short stories and articles scattered in: North America - World Journal, Sing Tao Daily, US Chinese Press, Asian Gazette, Chinese Literature of The Americas magazine; Australia - SameWay magazine; Thailand - World Journal Thailand; Taiwan - United Daily News, China Times...

Speech 
USA

2016 Mystery Novels of Taiwan Promotion
 From Agatha to Shimada, from Classic Mystery to New Mystery, 2016-06-11, California / San Francisco Public Library
2017 Showwe Writers' North American Tour
 Tracing The Sun, 2017-06-10, North American Tour - Stop I: California | San Francisco Public Library
 Tracing The Sun, 2017-06-10, North American Tour - Stop II: California | Cupertino Amazing Books
 Tracing The Sun, 2017-06-11, North American Tour - Stop III: California | Culture Center Of TECO in San Francisco
 Tracing The Sun, 2017-06-17, North American Tour - Stop IV: Texas | Dallas Chinese Community Center
 Tracing The Sun, 2017-06-18, North American Tour - Stop V: Texas | Houston Chinese Cultural Center
Taiwan
 The Impossible Crime, 2015-10-03, with Xerxes at Agatha's Murder Ink
 The Writing Schemes for a Novel, 2016-07-10, with Amanda Chi at Kaohsiung International Book Fair
 The Writing Schemes for a Novel, 2016-07-16, with Amanda Chi at New Taipei City Youth Library
 One for All and All for One, 2016-07-31, with Sc Chang and Chihwen Hsiung at King Car Art Gallery
 LOHAS is Easy, 2017-02-04, with TienLo Liang at Gov Books
 Tracing The Sun Vs. Life in Silicon Valley, 2017-02-10, with TienLo Liang at Taipei International Book Fair
 UMA, UFO and Outer Space, 2017-02-10, at Taipei International Book Fair
 UMA, UFO and Outer Space, 2017-02-12, with Dr. Ho-Ling Fu at Taipei International Book Fair
 How to Write a Mystery Story? 2017-10-21 How Do I Promote Taiwan's Mystery Novels? at King Car Art Gallery
One for All and All for One II, 2018-02-08 with Josef Lee, Xerxes and Chihwen Hsiungat at Agatha's Murder Ink
The Wide World of Mystery, 2018-02-24 at Taichung ChinSui Library

Radio Interview 
USA
 FM 92.3 The Universal FM, San Francisco, California, 2013-03-20, interviewed by Erin Liu
 FM 96.1 Sing Tao Chinese Radio, San Francisco, California, 2016-06-10, interviewed by Joron Lin
 FM 96.1 Sing Tao Chinese Radio, San Francisco, California, 2017-06-09, interviewed by Joron Lin
 AM1050 U.S. Chinese Channel, Houston, Texas, 2017-06-14, interviewed by Shu Ting

Links 

Tymo Lin Official Site
The Crime Writers' Association - Tymo Lin (UK)
The Crime Writers of Canada - Tymo Lin
The Mystery Writers of Taiwan - Tymo Lin

References 

Taiwanese male novelists
Taiwanese writers
Canadian mystery writers
Canadian columnists
Year of birth missing (living people)
Living people
Writers from Taipei
Vancouver Film School alumni
Canadian writers of Asian descent